Milaki may refer to:
 Miłaki, Poland
 Milaki, Iran (disambiguation), places in Iran